Ryan McGinnis is an American actor and dancer, known for his role in the ABC comedy series Ugly Betty as Austin Marley. He also appeared as Glenn Childs Jr. in two episodes of the second season of the CBS drama series The Good Wife.

Biography and career
McGinnis took dance classes at the Knecht Dance Academy in Levittown, Pennsylvania, for which he won numerous national Dance titles. He was Dance Masters of America's Petite Master Dance of America in 2006. After appearing in several commercials, small roles on the Nickelodeon sitcoms iCarly and Victorious, and starring in an episode of Law & Order: Criminal Intent, McGinnis was cast in a recurring role as Austin Marley, Justin's love interest, in the fourth season of Ugly Betty, appearing in the final five episodes of the show. He appears in the 2012 film Gayby.

Filmography

References

External links
 

1993 births
21st-century American male actors
American male child actors
American male dancers
American male film actors
American male television actors
Living people
Place of birth missing (living people)